Igrejinha ( — little church in Portuguese) is a municipality located in the metropolitan area of Porto Alegre, in the state of Rio Grande do Sul, Brazil. Home to the Morro Alto da Pedra and the regional park Parque Alto da Pedra.  The city has approximately 37,000 inhabitants and sits about 82 km (about 51 miles) from the capital city of the state, Porto Alegre.

Oktoberfest

Each year, the citizens of Igrejinha and visitors from the region celebrate Oktoberfest.  The city has a large population of German-Brazilians.  Thousands turn out each year for the Oktoberfest celebration.

The most significant period for tourism is during Oktoberfest, a traditional Bavarian beer festival, which sold 186,000 tickets at its pavilions in 2005—at which 209,561 liters of beer were drunk.

Town partnership
  Simmern, Rhineland-Palatinate, Germany

External links
  Igrejinha Hall website
 Igrejinha Oktoberfest site functions a few months before October only

More photos of Igrejinha

References

Municipalities in Rio Grande do Sul